Ash Fork High School is a high school in Ash Fork, Arizona. It is the only high school under the jurisdiction of the Ash Fork Joint Unified School District, which also includes an elementary school and middle school.

References

Public high schools in Arizona
Schools in Yavapai County, Arizona